Jovan Belimarković (1827–1906), was a Serbian general and politician.

Belimarković was born on January 1, 1827, in Belgrade, Principality of Serbia. He finished military school in Berlin.

He was awarded Order of Prince Danilo I, Order of the Cross of Takovo, Order of Miloš the Great and other decorations.

Military career
Bombing of Belgrade (1862)
Serbian–Ottoman War (1876–78)
Liberation of Vranje

References

Sources

1827 births
1906 deaths
19th-century Serbian people
Serbian generals
Politicians from Belgrade
People from the Principality of Serbia
Military personnel from Belgrade
Serbian–Turkish Wars (1876–1878)
 
Regents of Serbia
Defence ministers of Serbia
Interior ministers of Serbia
Construction ministers of Serbia